Kłoda  is a village in the administrative district of Gmina Rytwiany, within Staszów County, Świętokrzyskie Voivodeship, in south-central Poland.

The village has a population of  575.

Demography 
According to the 2002 Poland census, there were 572 people residing in Kłoda village, of whom 50% were male and 50% were female. In the village, the population was spread out, with 22.4% under the age of 18, 35% from 18 to 44, 23.4% from 45 to 64, and 19.2% who were 65 years of age or older.
 Figure 1. Population pyramid of village in 2002 — by age group and sex

References

Villages in Staszów County